Amanda E. Hargrove is a chemist and professor at Duke University (Durham, North Carolina, United States). Hargrove is also the editor-in-chief of Medicinal Research Reviews, and a member of the Scientific Advisory Board of Arrakis Therapeutics. At Duke University, Hargrove directs an interdisciplinary research program in chemical biology that focuses on harnessing the specific interactions between small molecules and RNA, and using those RNA-small molecule interactions to probe the structure, and function of RNA. The long-term goal of the group's research is to identify specific molecule-RNA interactions that may have therapeutic potential in the treatment of viral infection and human disease. She has received numerous awards for her scientific research, teaching, and service in support of diversity, equity, and inclusion.

Academic career 
Hargrove attended Trinity University in San Antonio, Texas and received her B.S. in Chemistry and Spanish in 2004. As an undergraduate student, she conducted research with John D. Spence on the synthesis and Bergman cyclization of meso-tethered enediyne-porphyrins. Hargrove conducted her graduate work with Professors Eric V. Anslyn and Jonathan L. Sessler at the University of Texas, Austin, and earned her Ph.D. in 2010 for her thesis, Combining recognition motifs for improved sensing and biological activity of oligosaccharides and phosphorylated molecules. From 2010 to 2013 she was an NIH Postdoctoral Fellow in Chemistry at California Institute of Technology, where she worked in the lab of Peter B. Dervan and conducted research on DNA-binding polyamides as inhibitors of a prostate-specific response gene in prostate cancer. Her postdoctoral work also focused on optimizing conditions to increase solubility of pyrrole-imidazole polyamide DNA-binding molecules as a strategy to increase their biological activity (these are a class of potential DNA-targeting therapeutics). Hargrove became assistant professor in the Department of Chemistry at Duke University in Durham, NC in 2013 and earned promotion to associate professor with tenure in 2020.

Research 
Hargrove's research program focuses on organic chemical synthesis and screening of small molecules that have specific interactions with different RNA structural motifs. The aim of the research is to identify small molecules that can target the specific RNA structures found in viruses. Hargrove's research program has identified RNA-binding molecules that can inhibit replication of Sars-CoV-2 virus and enterovirus (the virus that causes hand, foot, and mouth disease). The potential application of small molecules to treat various viral infections including enterovirus (Hand, Foot, and Mouth Disease) and SARS-CoV-2 has been discussed in popular media including the New York Times.

Awards and honors 
Hargrove has received numerous awards and honors:

 2022 Rising Star Award from the American Chemical Society Women Chemists Committee.
 2021 Cram Lehn Pedersen Prize.
 2020 Alfred P. Sloan Foundation Fellow.
2020 Duke University Dean's Diversity Award.
2018 National Science Foundation CAREER Award.
2017 Cottrell Scholar Award from Research Corporation for Science Advancement.
2015 Brent Nicklas-Prostate Cancer Foundation Young Investigator Award.
2014 Ralph E. Power Junior Faculty Enhancement Award.

References

External links 

Wikipedia Student Program
Duke University faculty

Living people
Year of birth missing (living people)
Trinity University (Texas) alumni
University of Texas alumni
American women chemists
Academic journal editors
American women academics